Lavinia was a merchant ship launched at Sunderland in 1815. She traded widely until a gale at the Cape of Good Hope in July 1822 wrecked her.

Career
Lavinia first appeared in Lloyd's Register (LR) in 1815.

On 5 April 1818 Lavinia, Keith, master, arrived in the Thames. She had been coming from Hamburg when she had temporarily grounded on the Mouse Sand and had to throw part of her cargo overboard to get free.

Fate
Lavinia, Keith, master, arrived at the Cape of Good Hope on 30 June 1822.

Lavinia was driven ashore at Table Bay. She was condemned as a constructive total loss and sold for breaking up.

citations and references
Citations

References
 

1815 ships
Age of Sail merchant ships of England
Maritime incidents in July 1822